Old Christians Club, or simply Old Christians, is an Uruguayan sports club from the Carrasco neighbourhood of Montevideo.

The club is known mostly for its rugby union team that became famous around the world due to the 1972 Uruguayan Air Force Flight 571 crash that involved the first division team of the club. Old Christians currently plays in Primera División, the top division of local rugby system.

Apart from rugby union, the club also hosts football and field hockey branches.

History 
Old Christians Club was founded in 1962 by alumni of the Christian Brothers – Stella Maris College, one of Montevideo's best high schools.

The institution started as a rugby union club and, like most rugby clubs in Uruguay and Argentina, also developed a field hockey section for girls; thus becoming a multi-sports club.

Flight 571 disaster 

On October 13, 1972, a plane carrying 40 members and players of Old Christians' rugby team en route to Chile, crashed in the Andes.
More than a quarter of the passengers died in the crash and several more quickly succumbed to cold and injury. Of the twenty-nine who were alive a few days after the accident, another eight were killed by an avalanche that swept over their shelter in the wreckage.

The survivors had little food and no source of heat in the harsh climate, at over 3,600 metres (11,800 ft) altitude. Faced with starvation and radio news reports that the search for them had been abandoned, the survivors fed on the dead passengers who had been preserved in the snow. Rescuers did not learn of the survivors until 72 days after the crash when passengers Nando Parrado and Roberto Canessa, after a 10-day trek across the Andes, found a Chilean huaso, who gave them food and then alerted authorities about the existence of the other survivors.

The story of the disaster has since been depicted in many movies, television shows and books.

Achievements in rugby
Despite being one of Montevideo's youngest clubs, Old Christians have achieved remarkable success on the national scene, winning their first national title only six years after the club's creation.

Since then the club has become a powerhouse of Uruguayan rugby, winning the Campeonato Uruguayo de Rugby 19 times, the most recent one in 2017.

Many Old Christians have also gone on to represent Uruguay at international level.

The club's main rivals are Carrasco Polo Club and Old Boys Club.

Honours
Campeonato Uruguayo de Rugby
Winners (20): 1968, 1970, 1973, 1976, 1977, 1978, 1979, 1980, 1982, 1984, 1985, 1986, 1987, 1988, 1989, 2007, 2015, 2016, 2017, 2019

Campeonato Liga Universitaria de fútbol +40
Winners (2): 2020, 2021

References

External links
 

Uruguayan rugby union teams
Sport in Montevideo
Football clubs in Montevideo
Rugby clubs established in 1962
1962 establishments in Uruguay
Uruguayan Air Force Flight 571